The 1968 United States presidential election in Florida was held on November 5, 1968. Florida voters chose fourteen electors, or representatives to the Electoral College, who voted for president and vice president.

Background
Between the imposition of a poll tax in 1889 and the migration of numerous northerners seeking a hotter climate in the 1940s, Florida had been a one-party Democratic state, lacking any traditional white Republicanism due to  the absence of mountains or German "Forty-Eighter" settlements. So late as the landmark court case of Smith v. Allwright (1944), half of Florida's registered Republicans were still black, although very few blacks in Florida had ever voted within the previous fifty-five years. When new migrants from traditionally Republican northern states took up residence in Central Florida and brought with them their Republican voting habits at presidential level, the GOP restricted President Truman to under half the statewide vote in 1948, and when voting for Dwight D. Eisenhower and Richard Nixon carried the state in the following three elections.

1964 saw a complete reversal of the 1950s voting pattern of a largely Republican south and central Florida and continuing Democratic loyalty in the North, with almost zero correlation between 1960 and 1964 county returns. Incumbent Lyndon Johnson narrowly carried the state with black and retiree votes but lost most Panhandle Kennedy support to Goldwater.

Following his landslide sweep of the northern states, Lyndon Johnson's Great Society at first appeared to be helping him in Florida; however, the relationship soured quickly as the Democratic Party factionalized. In 1966, via a campaign portraying his opponent as a dangerous liberal, Claude R. Kirk defeated Miami Mayor Robert King Hugh to become (alongside Winthrop Rockefeller) the first GOP Governor of any Confederate State since Alfred A. Taylor in 1922.

Further political unrest, including a major teachers' strike in the winter of 1967–1968, along with stalemate in the Vietnam War, further cut into the Democratic Party's local popularity, which was further affected by Alabama Governor George Wallace entering the race under the "American Independent" banner.

Along with political unrest, the state faced civil unrest as well. During the Long, hot summer of 1967 the state saw several riots take place, the largest, in Tampa, lasting four days in total. Clearwater, Lakeland, Riviera Beach and West Palm Beach saw riots that were smaller in scale. During the Martin Luther King assassination riots in 1968, several riots were known to have taken place in state such as in: Tallahassee, Jacksonville and Fort Pierce.

Vote
After contentious primaries, Florida was initially considered a state which all three candidates had a chance to carry.

Republican candidate Richard Nixon won the state of Florida by a margin of 9.60% or 210,010 votes.

Nixon obtained his support in Central Florida, Democratic candidate Hubert Humphrey got his support from Southern Florida, and third-party candidate George Wallace got his support from the Florida Panhandle, or Northern Florida. This was one of the better states for George Wallace, due to the Northern part of the state being against the Civil Rights Act of 1964, which Lyndon Johnson had signed into law. This led to Democratic party gains in support from black voters. The party simultaneously lost the great majority of white voters. One exception to this abandonment by white voters came in the Jewish sections of Miami. It is estimated that over 80% of the non-Hispanic white electorate backed Nixon or Wallace, with Wallace being the choice among those whites in the northern counties with larger numbers of proximate black voters, and Nixon in those areas with few or no blacks.

, this is the last election in which Escambia County, Clay County, Okaloosa County, and Santa Rosa County did not support the Republican candidate. This was the first time ever that Bradford County, Gilchrist County, and Union County did not vote for the Democratic candidate, the first time since 1848 that Hamilton County did not vote Democratic, and the first time since 1856 that Levy County did not vote Democratic (Bradford County, Hamilton County, and Levy County did vote for Southern Democrat John C. Breckinridge over official Democratic nominee Stephen Douglas in 1860, however Douglas was not on the ballot in Florida and Breckinridge was listed as the official Democratic candidate.)

Results

Results by county

Notes

References

Florida
1968 Florida elections
1968